Gunilla Jacobsson (born 7 May 1946) is a Swedish speed skater. She competed in four events at the 1964 Winter Olympics.

References

External links
 

1946 births
Living people
Swedish female speed skaters
Olympic speed skaters of Sweden
Speed skaters at the 1964 Winter Olympics
Sportspeople from Gothenburg